Wolfgang Böhme (born 17 December 1949) is an East German former handball player who competed in the 1972 Summer Olympics.

He was born in Wolfen. He was the husband of Ute Rührold, but they are now divorced.

In 1972 he was part of the East German team which finished fourth in the Olympic tournament. He played five matches and scored eleven goals.

External links
profile

1949 births
Living people
German male handball players
Olympic handball players of East Germany
Handball players at the 1972 Summer Olympics
People from Bitterfeld-Wolfen
Sportspeople from Saxony-Anhalt
People from Bezirk Halle